The women's 3000 meter at the 2010 KNSB Dutch Single Distance Championships took place in Heerenveen at the Thialf ice skating rink on Saturday 31 October 2009. Although this tournament was held in 2009, it was part of the 2009–2010 speed skating season .

There were 20 participants.

Title holder was Renate Groenewold.

The first 5 skaters qualified for the following 2009–10 ISU Speed Skating World Cup tournaments.

Overview

Result

  DQ = Disqualified

Draw

Source:

References

Single Distance Championships
2010 Single Distance
World